In mathematics, a ternary quartic form is a degree 4 homogeneous polynomial in three variables.

Hilbert's theorem

 showed that a positive semi-definite ternary quartic form over the reals  can be written as a sum of three squares of quadratic forms.

Invariant theory

The Salmon invariant is a degree 60 invariant vanishing on ternary quartics with an
inflection bitangent.

Catalecticant

The catalecticant of a ternary quartic is the resultant of its 6 second partial derivatives. It vanishes when the ternary quartic can be written as a sum of five 4th powers of linear forms.

See also

Ternary cubic
Invariants of a binary form

References

.

External links

Invariants of the ternary quartic

Invariant theory